Ronald John Hayter (July 30, 1936 – April 21, 2018) was the longest-serving city councillor of Edmonton, Alberta, having served since 1971 until 1995, when he stepped down to join the National Parole Board. He returned to council during the 2001 civic election, was re-elected in the 2004 and 2007 civic elections, and retired in 2010. During his tenure, he spearheaded people-friendly development such as the Shaw Convention Center, the LRT, waste recycling programs, preservation of the River Valley wilderness, and promotion of arts and especially sports events that helped turned a modest oil and agriculture city into a world class capital. He was proudest though, of his lifelong efforts to promote the rights of, and create reconciliation with, First Nations communities.

Background
Hayter was born in Northern Saskatchewan on July 30, 1936, to Vera Smith Hayter of Regina, Saskatchewan, and Raleigh "Slim" Hayter, of Murray Hill, Prince Edward Island.  Raleigh was then a Saskatchewan lumberman who later lived as a trapper in Northern Alberta on the Little Berland River until his death in 1984.  Ron was the oldest of six boys, all raised in the lumber camp at Akosane, Saskatchewan.  They were a poor family.  His father was opposed to school, and Hayter didn't get the chance to attend school until age 12 when his father was incarcerated for illegal deer hunting.  He nevertheless graduated at 18 and went to work for Margaret Lally "Ma" Murray as a reporter for the Alaska Highway News.  When he was 22, in 1957, he got a scoop about the collapse of the Peace River Suspension Bridge, which got him national attention and a job at the Edmonton Journal.  The night his first child was born, he appeared live on the CBC quiz show Front Page Challenge to discuss this story.

Hayter later became a correspondent for Time magazine.  An amateur boxer and baseball player in his youth, he went on to sit on international sporting bodies IAMBA and the World Boxing Association (WBA), and headed the Canadian Boxing body for many years.  He was a judge at some world heavyweight bouts and helped bring baseball to the Summer Olympics. In 2006, he was inducted into the Canadian Baseball Hall of Fame and was also in the Canadian Boxing Hall of Fame.  He served as president of the Federation of Canadian Municipalities. Former Prime Minister Lester B. Pearson hired Hayter as an advisor to help create Sport Canada. He received the Vanier Award and the Queen's Jubilee Medal for community service.

Hayter was married to Grace Jacqueline (Jac'y) Bacon Hayter who predeceased him in 2005, and was the father of four children, the writer Sparkle Hayter, Sandra Hayter, Nevin Hayter, and Hudson Hayter, who died in infancy.  He was the nephew of the late bush pilot and aviation pioneer Henry W. "Harry" Hayter, who is in Canada's Aviation Hall of Fame. Hayter was diagnosed with dementia in his later years and died of pneumonia on April 21, 2018, in St. Albert, Alberta, at the age of 81.

References

1936 births
2018 deaths
Canadian Baseball Hall of Fame inductees
Canadian magazine journalists
Deaths from pneumonia in Alberta
Edmonton city councillors
Politicians from Regina, Saskatchewan
20th-century Canadian politicians
21st-century Canadian politicians